South Coast Repertory (SCR) is a professional theatre company located in Costa Mesa, California.

Tony Award-winning South Coast Repertory, founded in 1964 by David Emmes and Martin Benson, is led by Artistic Director David Ivers and Managing Director Paula Tomei. SCR is widely regarded as one of America's foremost producers of new plays. In its three-stage David Emmes/Martin Benson Theatre Center, SCR produces a wide range of theatre, ranging from classics, to modern masterpieces, contemporary hits and new plays on the leading edge. It also produces Theatre for Young Audiences and Families plays, and offers year-round programs in education and outreach. SCR is the home to the Pacific Playwrights Festival, an annual three-day new play festival.

Background
SCR's extensive new play development program consists of commissions, residencies, readings, and workshops, from which up to five world premieres are produced each season. Among the plays commissioned and introduced at SCR are Donald Margulies' Sight Unseen, Collected Stories, Brooklyn Boy, and Shipwrecked! An Entertainment; Richard Greenberg's Three Days of Rain, Everett Beekin, Hurrah at Last and The Violet Hour; David Henry Hwang's Golden Child, José Rivera's References to Salvador Dalí Make Me Hot, Lynn Nottage's Intimate Apparel, Craig Lucas' Prelude to a Kiss, Amy Freed's The Beard of Avon and Freedomland and Margaret Edson's Pulitzer Prize-winning Wit. These plays were commissioned by SCR and developed through its Pacific Playwrights Festival, an annual workshop and reading showcase for up to eight new plays, attended by artistic directors and literary staff members from across the country.

Forty percent of the plays SCR has produced have been world, American or West Coast premieres. In 1988, SCR received the Regional Theatre Tony Award for Distinguished Achievement, particularly in the area of new play development.

History
David Emmes and Martin Benson attended San Francisco State University. After graduation, Emmes and Benson gathered a few San Francisco friends in summer 1963 to stage Arthur Schnitzler's La Ronde at the Off-Broadway Theatre in Long Beach, California.

After that experience, Emmes and Benson were convinced there was a future for them in theatre and they sketched out a plan to create a theatre company. The first step would involve touring to rented stages. In November 1964, SCR's first production, Molière's Tartuffe, opened at the Newport Beach Ebell Club. (SCR celebrated its 50th season in 2013-14 by including a production of "Tartuffe.")

The next step would be their own location. They chose to locate it in Orange County Calif., virgin territory for a major arts institution.

Second Step Theatre

For their Second Step, a two-story marine hardware store on Balboa Peninsula was rented and converted into a 75-seat proscenium stage. It opened on March 12, 1965, with a production of Waiting for Godot.

Confident of their ability to continue, Emmes and Benson sought to convince their adopted community of SCR's future importance. They displayed an "Artistic Manifesto" in the Second Step lobby, which boasted a four-step model of growth: the first season of touring, the present location's 75-seat stage, and two more transformations leading to a major regional center for theatre arts and education.

While the goal of running a nationally renowned arts institution spurred them on from the Second Step lobby wall, the young company went about the business of surviving. For years, everyone involved maintained full-time day jobs and worked nights and weekends without pay. They designed and built their scenery, sold the tickets, ushered, and — of course — acted. Among the first acting company members were Don Took, Martha McFarland and Art Koustik, joined over the next seasons by Richard Doyle, Hal Landon Jr. and Ron Boussom. These were among the theatre's Founding Artists.

Third Step Theatre
Within two years, artistic and financial momentum had picked up and SCR looked toward its Third Step: a converted Sprouse-Reitz Variety Store on Newport Boulevard in Costa Mesa. The building, adapted to hold 217 seats, opened in 1967.

It was at the Third Step, 1967–1978, that SCR moved from a local group to a regional force, and matured both artistically and organizationally. Operating income went from US$20,000 to US$55,000 in the first two seasons. By the fifth season, paid staff had grown from one to five. A first grant from the National Endowment for the Arts helped expand the staff. The Los Angeles Drama Critics Circle gave SCR its first award in 1970 for "consistent achievement in production." In 1976, SCR joined the League of Resident Theatres (LORT) and was able to contract for members of Actors' Equity.

By 1977, the company was outgrowing its space again. The budget was more than US$250,000, a year later, there were more than 9,400 subscribers and capacity was pushing 99 percent.

Emmes and Benson addressed the question of SCR's future and moved forward toward the long-anticipated Fourth Step Theatre. They formed a new board of community leaders to address the realities of funding, designing, and building Orange County's first resident theatre facility. The Segerstrom family gifted the land for the theatre's future site.

In September 1978, the theatre opened with a production of William Saroyan's The Time of Your Life.

At first, there was only the 507-seat Mainstage. But by 1979, the large rehearsal hall had been converted into a 161-seat Second Stage. SCR had reached its long-sought goal: a two-theatre complex, owned and operated by the company itself.

Fourth Step Theatre

During the 1980s, SCR's interest in new play development moved to the forefront. In 1985, the NEA awarded SCR a Challenge Grant, which helped finance the creation of the Collaboration Laboratory (Colab), which would support all play development in the future.

The 1985-86 Season unveiled Colab's first two public programs: the NewSCRipts play reading series and the Hispanic Playwrights Project. Also that season, ground was broken on a distinctive addition to the building called The Artists Wing.

Then, in 1988, SCR earned the highest recognition in regional theatre: a Regional Theatre Tony Award for its achievements.

During the 1990s, SCR solidified its national reputation for play development. Writers were discovered, nurtured, and then championed. Margaret Edson, whose Wit premiere at SCR in 1995, won the 1999 Pulitzer Prize for Drama. Donald Margulies, whose Sight Unseen and Collected Stories originated at SCR before meeting with New York success, won the 2000 Pulitzer for Dinner With Friends. Other playwrights who had multiple premieres at SCR also became familiar names in theatres across America: Amy Freed, Craig Lucas, Howard Korder, Keith Reddin, Octavio Solis, and Richard Greenberg, who has had nine commissioned world premieres at SCR.

In the summer of 1998, following its 35th anniversary season, SCR launched the Pacific Playwrights Festival, its most ambitious new play project to date. The Pacific Playwrights Festival incorporated the Hispanic Playwrights Project, two world premieres, and workshops or staged readings of seven more new plays.

By the end of 1998, SCR began pursuing its long-held expansion goal when the Segerstrom family donated land. That land, along with a similar donation to the neighboring Orange County Performing Arts Center, established the Segerstrom Center for the Arts. Within weeks, SCR received its first gift of more than US$1 million, when Henry and Stacey Nicholas gave US$1.28 million (eventually doubling their gift to US$2.5 million to name the renovated Second Stage the Nicholas Studio) and launched "SCR: The Next Stage" Campaign, initially to raise US$40 million. Architect César Pelli was enlisted for both the center's and SCR's expansion, with SCR's construction beginning first.

The focal point of Pelli's expansion design was a 336-seat proscenium stage. In front of it would be the common lobby and behind it would be three stories of offices.

At the ground breaking ceremony in July 2001, a US$5 million naming gift for the new stage was announced from George and Julianne Argyros.

In April 2002, Board President and Campaign Chairman Paul Folino announced the campaign's largest gift — and the largest single gift ever to a regional theatre by an individual. It was from the Folino family, and at US$10 million, it became the complex's naming gift.

The first season in the Folino Theatre Center earned rave reviews and introduced three plays — Greenberg's The Violet Hour, Lynn Nottage's Intimate Apparel and Rolin Jones' The Intelligent Design of Jenny Chow. All have since gone on to major productions in New York and elsewhere.

With the expansion of its physical plant and endowment, and with additional support from the Whittier Family Foundations, SCR was ready for its biggest programmatic growth in two decades: the introduction of the three-play series "Theatre for Young Audiences ... and Their Families," which debuted in 2003 to tremendous response.

Theatre Leadership and Recent Accomplishments 
2011 marked a major leadership transition for SCR: Marc Masterson became the theatre's new Artistic Director, with Managing Director Paula Tomei serving as his co-CEO. Emmes and Benson moved into the roles of Founding Artistic Directors, from which they continue to share the wisdom and knowledge gained in their 47 years at the theatre's helm.

Beginning in 2012, SCR launched "Studio SCR," a series that partnered the theatre with a variety of Southern Californian artists to create an eclectic, edgy and contemporary theatre experience. The series went on hiatus in 2016.

In 2013, Paul Folino requested that his name be withdrawn from the Theatre Center and that it be renamed the David Emmes/Martin Benson Theatre Center, to honor SCR's founders. The unveiling of the building's new name took place on January 22, 2014.

The 2015-16 season brought the world premiere of Qui Nguyen's Vietgone—in association with Manhattan Theatre Club. The production moved to Manhattan Theatre Club for its 2016–17 season. Vietgone earned a Los Angeles Drama Critics Circle Ted Schmitt Award for Best World Premiere of the Year, along with the prestigious Harold and Mimi Steinberg / American Theatre Critics Association New Play Award and a Lucille Lortel Award in New York for Outstanding Projection Design.It also was a finalist for the Edward M. Kennedy Prize for Drama Inspired by American History. In addition, SCR's 52nd season included world premieres by Sandra Tsing Loh (The Madwoman in the Volvo), Bekah Brunstetter (Going to a Place where you Already Are) and Eliza Clark (Future Thinking).

The 2016-17 season featured four world premieres: The Siegel by Michael Mitnick; Yoga Play by Dipika Guha; Flora & Ulysses by John Glore; and A Doll's House, Part 2 by Lucas Hnath (an SCR commission), which had a nearly simultaneous second production on Broadway. SCR's annual showcase of new works, the Pacific Playwrights Festival, celebrated its 20th year.

The 2017-18 season included the musical Once, as well as Shakespeare in Love, The Sisters Rosensweig by Wendy Wasserstein and Gem of the Ocean by August Wilson. The season featured five world premieres including Amos & Boris by Sofia Alvarez; Curve of Departure by Rachel Bonds; SHREW! by Amy Freed; Little Black Shadows by Kemp Powers; and Cambodian Rock Band by Lauren Yee, commissioned through SCR's CrossRoads Initiative. Yee's Cambodian Rock Band received the prestigious Harold and Mimi Steinberg / American Theatre Critics Association Award in 2019.  Masterson stepped down as Artistic Director at the end of the season.

David Ivers was named as the theatre's Artistic Director on Sept. 20, 2018.  In April 2019, he directed a concert-reading of Prelude to a Kiss: The Musical, with book by Craig Lucas, music by Daniel Messé an lyrics by Sean Hartley, during the Pacific Playwrights Festival. The 2019–20 season, the first he programmed, included the musical She Loves Me by Joe Masteroff, Jerry Bock and Sheldon Harnick (directed by Ivers),  American Mariachi by José Cruz González, Arcadia by Tom Stoppard, Outside Mullingar by John Patrick Shanley, Aubergine by Julia Cho and Fireflies by Donja R. Love.  SCR's 56th season also had four world premieres scheduled: The Canadians by Adam Bock; The Scarlet Letter by Kate Hamill; I Get Restless by Caroline V. McGraw; and the young audiences play Dory Fantasmagory, a play by John Glore adapted from the book by Abby Hanlon.

In late 2019, SCR re-branded, expanded and deepened its new-play development program by launching The Lab@SCR.  As part of The Lab@SCR, the theatre is developing Threshold by Amy Brennerman, Beatrice by Lauren Gunderson and a musical adaptation of Prelude to a Kiss, with book by Craig Lucas, music by Daniel Messé an lyrics by Sean Hartley. Among the new features of the theatre's renowned play development program was the creation of the Pinnacle Commission for major American playwrights.  The inaugural commission—given in partnership with Playwrights Horizons (New York)—was $60,000, with the selected playwright scheduled to be named in 2020, and was one of the largest theatre-granted commissions in the nation. The theatre announced its 2020-21 season in March 2020.

The COVID-19 pandemic in March 2020 subsequently led SCR to cancel the final five productions of its 2019–20 season (Outside Mullingar, The Scarlet Letter, I Get Restless, Arcadia and Dory Fantasmagory) as well as cancel that year's Pacific Playwrights Festival. SCR's Theatre Conservatory classes (kids, teens and adults) moved online.

While its stages went dark during the pandemic, SCR continued its work to deepen engagement with Orange County, Calif., communities through various avenues including SCR commUNITY, launched in August 2020. This new digital platform is dedicated to amplifying the artists and narratives of the region by producing stories inspired by or about the rich diversity of people living in Southern California.  Using “virtual/digital” platforms, SCR commUNITY creates free play readings, interviews, radio plays and original innovative content. The first three SCR commUNITY events included MASA, a live reading of works by four playwrights, as well a live interview with playwright Octavio Solis.

With the pandemic leading to a cancelation of the spring productions in the 2019-20 season—and the suspension of a full 2020-21 season—SCR shifted to online offerings to engage with audiences. The Conservatory adapted its classes to be taught online. In 2021, a Spring/Summer season was offered, running April through August. It included a digital Theatre for Young Audiences family show, Red Riding Hood by Allison Gregory (offered free to Orange County public schoolchildren); five professionally filmed readings for the Pacific Playwrights Festival, including works by Dan Collins and Julianne Wick Davis (Harold & Lillian); Shayan Lotfi (Park-e Laleh); Charlie Oh (Coleman ’72, directed by Artistic Director David Ivers); Christine Quintana (Clean); and York Walker (Covenant). In July and August, the new summer series Outside SCR debuted with performances of American Mariachi by José Cruz González and You’re a Good Man, Charlie Brown live, under the stars, at the historic Mission San Juan Capistrano.

In October 2021, SCR returned to live in-person performances at the Emmes/Benson Theatre Center with COVID-19 vaccine/testing and masking requirements. The on-site season featured a total of seven plays, opening with the world premiere of A Shot Rang Out: A Play in One Man by Richard Greenberg, featuring David Ivers. The Pacific Playwrights Festival returned to its traditional live, in-person format in the Spring of 2022, showcasing one full production, five readings and an excerpt of a new musical-in-progress. In July and August 2022, SCR went offsite for a second summer of Outside SCR at Mission San Juan Capistrano, this time featuring the musical Million Dollar Quartet.

References

External links
 South Coast Repertory official website
 

Performing groups established in 1964
Orange County, California culture
Costa Mesa, California
Theatre companies in California
Theatres in Orange County, California
Tony Award winners
Regional theatre in the United States